In United States presidential politics, voters within both the Democratic and Republican parties select their candidates for the presidential election through a series of primary elections. For this list, any candidate that received at least 250,000 total votes in an election year's primary contests will be included. Only elections conducted since nationwide primaries were instituted in 1972 are shown.

History
The first state to hold a primary was Florida in 1901. In 1905, Wisconsin was the first state to hold a direct open primary. Five years later, in 1910, Oregon was the first state to hold a primary that bound its state's delegates to the convention based on election results. Between 1932 and 1968, twelve states held primaries consistently, while the remaining states chose which candidate received their delegates through state party bosses. In 1972, both parties held a primary or caucus in every state for the first time. However, Republican Richard Nixon was the incumbent president and was seeking re-election. As such, the Republican primary was uneventful that year, with Nixon winning every state easily. On the Democratic side, six candidates battled for the nomination. George McGovern of South Dakota won the first nationwide primary. Today, the first state to hold a caucus during primary season is Iowa, typically in early February. Shortly after that is the first primary, held in New Hampshire.

List

See also
List of United States presidential candidates by number of votes received

References

United States presidential primaries